The ninth season of The Real Housewives of Orange County, an American reality television series, was broadcast on Bravo. It aired from April 14, 2014 until September 8, 2014, and was primarily filmed in Orange County, California. Its executive producers were Adam Karpel, Alex Baskin, Douglas Ross, Gregory Stewart, Scott Dunlop, Stephanie Boyriven and Andy Cohen.

The Real Housewives of Orange County focuses on the lives of Vicki Gunvalson, Tamra Judge, Heather Dubrow, Shannon Beador and Lizzie Rovsek. It consisted of 21 episodes.

Production and crew
In November 2013, Lydia McLaughlin revealed there would be a ninth season after announcing her departure from the series. 
In March 2014, the official cast, trailer and premiere date of the season were announced. The season premiere "Hawaii 5 Uh-Oh" was aired on April 14, 2014, while the eighteenth episode "All Apologies" served as the season finale, and was aired on August 18, 2014. It was followed by a two-part reunion that aired on August 25 and September 1, 2014, and a "Secrets Revealed" episode on September 8, 2014, which marked the conclusion of the season. Adam Karpel, Alex Baskin, Douglas Ross, Gregory Stewart, Scott Dunlop, Stephanie Boyriven and Andy Cohen are recognized as the series' executive producers; it is produced and distributed by Evolution Media.

Cast and synopsis
Three of the six housewives featured on the eighth season of The Real Housewives of Orange County returned for the ninth instalment.
In September 2013, it was revealed that Gretchen Rossi and Alexis Bellino had not been asked to return for season 9, despite Bellino's willingness to quit prior to season 8.
In November 2013, Lydia McLaughlin announced her departure from the series, saying, "I never wanted to make a career out of being a housewife. That's never really been a dream of mine", and "I want to build my brand outside of the Housewives. I've always been really honest with the producers about that. I knew that while I was filming it that I probably wasn't going to be doing it again." In 2015, McLaughlin said she would be open to returning to Bravo on her own show.
Recurring cast member and former housewife Lauri Peterson also leaves the series.
Joining the series in the ninth season are two new wives, Shannon Beador and Lizzie Rovsek, and recurring cast member, Danielle Gregorio. Beador is described as "quirky yet fearless," and Rovsek an "opinionated former beauty queen." Gregorio is a charitable friend to the ladies, who is brash and brutally honest. Throughout the season Gregorio finds herself in the middle of the drama among the wives.

Heather Dubrow continues pursuing her acting endeavors and lands a guest role on Hawaii Five-0. Dubrow oversees the construction of her new family home and celebrates the breaking ground with a hoedown party. Tension arises throughout the season after some of the ladies deem Dubrow as too uptight and judgmental. The drama escalates to Dubrow and Beador feuding, causing Dubrow to kick Beador out of her home. Later the drama explodes at Rovsek's parents' house when rumors of Dubrow gossiping about Beador come to light, and some are left questioning Beador's integrity and stability. Dubrow and Tamra Judge also feel a rift in their friendship, which worsens when Dubrow invites Judge onto Good Day L.A.
Newlywed Judge considers having a child with Eddie as she deals with her son's health issues. To experience what having a child would be like, the Judges order a robotic baby called Astro. Judge is left in tears when her son Ryan drops a bomb regarding his girlfriend Sarah.
Vicki Gunvalson's divorce to Donn finalizes and she continues to struggle to find common ground between Ayers and everyone else, especially her daughter. Gunvalson worries that Briana and her husband Ryan will likely relocate to Oklahoma.
Beador experiences difficulties in balancing her career and marriage to her husband David, especially when he sends her a shocking email.
Rovsek is unsure whether to pursue her career as a swimsuit designer or have a third child with her husband Christian. During the season, Rovesk has one of the worst birthdays she has ever had. Rovsek also finds herself in the middle of Dubrow and Beador's feud, as well as finding herself feuding with Judge.

 Dubrow's husband and Beador's then-husband both appear at the reunion. Mr. Dubrow sits on the end of the left couch next to his wife. Mr. Beador sits between his wife and Gunvalson. Gunvalson and Rosvek each move down so he can be seated.

Episodes

References

External links

 
 
 

2014 American television seasons
Orange County (season 9)